"Bit by Bit" is a song recorded by the Canadian country music artist John Landry. It was released in 1999 as the second single from his first album, Forever Took Too Long. It peaked at number 9 on the RPM Country Tracks chart on October 4, 1999.

Chart performance

Year-end charts

References

1999 songs
1999 singles
John Landry songs